Makoula is a town in the Siglé Department of Boulkiemdé Province in central western Burkina Faso. It has a population of 2,191.

References

Populated places in Boulkiemdé Province